Heavy Meta is the third studio album by Nekrogoblikon, released on June 2, 2015. The album spawned two music videos, for the songs "We need a Gimmick", and Nekrogoblikon.

Track listing

Personnel

Nekrogoblikon 
 Nicky "Scorpion" Calonne – lead vocals, keyboards
 Alex "Goldberg" Alereza – guitars, backing vocals
 Joe "Diamond" Nelson – guitars, backing vocals
 Brandon "Fingers" Frenzel – bass
 Eddie "Bready" Trager – drums
 Aaron "Raptor" Minich – keyboards

Additional musicians 
 Andrew W.K. – vocals on "Let's Get F****d"

Production 
 Nekrogoblikon – production
 Matt Hyde – production
 Nicky Calonne – production
 Matt Good – mixing
 Taylor Larson – mastering

References 

2015 albums
Nekrogoblikon albums
Albums produced by Matt Hyde